Gamma Cassiopeiae, Latinized from γ Cassiopeiae, is a bright star at the center of the distinctive "W" asterism in the northern circumpolar constellation of Cassiopeia. Although it is a fairly bright star with an apparent visual magnitude that varies from 1.6 to 3.0, it has no traditional Arabic or Latin name. It sometimes goes by the informal name Navi.

Gamma Cassiopeiae is a Be star, a variable star, and a multiple star system. Based upon parallax measurements made by the Hipparcos satellite, it is located at a distance of roughly 550 light-years from Earth. Together with its common-proper-motion companion, HD 5408, the system could contain a total of eight stars.

Physical properties

Gamma Cassiopeiae is an eruptive variable star, whose apparent magnitude changes irregularly between +1.6 and +3.0. It is the prototype of the class of Gamma Cassiopeiae variable stars. In the late 1930s it underwent what is described as a shell episode and the brightness increased to above magnitude +2.0, then dropped rapidly to +3.4.  It has since been gradually brightening back to around +2.2. At maximum intensity, γ Cassiopeiae outshines both α Cassiopeiae (magnitude +2.25) and β Cassiopeiae (magnitude +2.3).

Gamma Cassiopeiae is a rapidly spinning star with a projected rotational velocity of 472 km s−1, giving it a pronounced equatorial bulge. When combined with the star's high luminosity, the result is the ejection of matter that forms a hot circumstellar disk of gas. The emissions and brightness variations are apparently caused by this "decretion disk".

The spectrum of this massive star matches a stellar classification of B0.5 IVe. A luminosity class of IV identifies it as a subgiant star that has reached a stage of its evolution where it is exhausting the supply of hydrogen in its core region and transforming into a giant star. The 'e' suffix is used for stars that show emission lines of hydrogen in the spectrum, caused in this case by the circumstellar disk. This places it among a category known as Be stars; in fact, the first such star ever to be so designated. It has 17 times the Sun's mass and is radiating as much energy as 34,000 Suns. At this rate of emission, the star has reached the end of its life as a late O-type main sequence star after a relatively brief 8 million years. The outer atmosphere has an intense effective temperature of 25,000 K, which is causing it to glow with a blue-white hue.

X-ray emission
Gamma Cassiopeiae is the prototype of a small group of stellar sources of X-ray radiation that is about 10 times stronger than emitted from other B or Be stars. The character of the X-ray spectrum is Be thermal, possibly emitted from plasmas of temperatures up to least ten million kelvins, and shows very short term and long-term cycles. Historically, it has been held that these X-rays might be excited by matter originating from the star, from a hot wind or a disk around the star, accreting onto the surface of a degenerate companion, such as a white dwarf or neutron star. However, there are difficulties with either of these hypotheses. For example, it is not clear that enough matter can be accreted by a white dwarf, at the distance of the purported secondary star implied by the orbital period, sufficient to power an X-ray emission of nearly 1033 erg/s or 100 YW. A neutron star could easily power this X-ray flux, but X-ray emission from neutron stars is known to be non-thermal, and thus in apparent variance with the spectral properties.

Evidence suggests that the X-rays may be associated with the Be star itself or caused by some complex interaction between the star and surrounding decretion disk. One line of evidence is that the X-ray production is known to vary on both short and long time scales with respect to various UV line and continuum changes associated with a B star or with circumstellar matter close to the star. Moreover, the X-ray emissions exhibit long-term cycles that correlate with the light curves in the visible wavelengths.

Gamma Cassiopeiae exhibits characteristics consistent with a strong disordered magnetic field. No field can be measured directly from the Zeeman effect because of the star's rotation-broadened spectral lines. Instead, the presence of this field is inferred from a robust periodic signal of 1.21 days that suggests a magnetic field rooted on the rotating star's surface. The star's UV and optical spectral lines show ripples moving from blue to red over several hours, which indicates clouds of matter being held frozen over the star's surface by strong magnetic fields. This evidence suggests that a magnetic field from the star is interacting with the decretion disk, resulting in the X-ray emission. A disk dynamo has been advanced as a mechanism to explain this modulation of the X-rays. However, difficulties remain with this mechanism, among which is that there are no disk dynamos known to exist in other stars, rendering this behavior more difficult to analyze.

Companions
Gamma Cassiopeiae has three faint companions, listed in double star catalogues as components B, C, and D. Star B is about 2 arc-seconds distant and magnitude 11, and has a similar space velocity to the bright primary, making it likely to be physically associated.  Component C is magnitude 13, nearly an arc-minute distant, and is listed in Gaia Early Data Release 3 as having a very different proper motion and being much more distant than Gamma Cassiopeiae.  Finally, component D, about 21 arc-minutes distant, is the naked-eye star HR 266 (HD 5408), itself a quadruple system.

Gamma Cassiopeiae A, the bright primary, itself contains a spectroscopic binary with an orbital period of about 203.5 days and an eccentricity alternately reported as 0.26 and "near zero." The mass of the companion is believed to be about that of the Sun, but its nature is unclear. It has been proposed that it is a degenerate star or a hot helium star, but it seems unlikely that it is a normal star. Therefore, it is likely to be more evolved than the primary and to have transferred mass to it during an earlier stage of evolution. Additionally, Hipparcos data show a "wobble" with an amplitude of about 150 mas, that may correspond to the orbit of a third star. This star would have an orbital period of at least 60 years.

Names
The Chinese name Tsih, "the whip", is commonly associated with this star. The name however originally referred to Kappa Cassiopeiae, and Gamma Cassiopeiae was just one of four horses pulling the chariot of legendary charioteer Wangliang. This representation was later changed to make Gamma the whip.

The star was used as an easily identifiable navigational reference point during space missions and American astronaut Virgil Ivan "Gus" Grissom nicknamed the star Navi after his own middle name spelled backwards.

See also
 Iota Ursae Majoris, informally named Dnoces for astronaut Ed White
 Gamma Velorum, informally named Regor for astronaut Roger B. Chaffee

References

External links
 Philippe Stee's homepage: Hot and Active Stars Research
Gamma Cassiopeiae and the Be Stars.
A New Class of X-ray Star?
Gamma Cas and Friends,  Astronomy Picture of the Day, 2009 December 24

Cassiopeiae, Gamma
B-type subgiants
Cassiopeia (constellation)
Gamma Cassiopeiae variable stars

8

Spectroscopic binaries
Be stars
Cassiopeiae, 27
0264
005934
004427
BD+59 0144
Navi
Gus Grissom